Pyx or PYX may refer to:

 PyX (vector graphics language), vector graphics library
 The Pyx, a 1973 Canadian film
 Pyx, a host container
 Trial of the Pyx, a UK quality assurance procedure for newly minted coins
 Pyx Lax, a Greek rock band
 Pyxis, a constellation, abbreviated as Pyx
 PYX, IATA airport code for Pattaya Airpark in Thailand, in List of airports by IATA code: P